Serb diaspora refers to the diaspora communities of ethnic Serbs. It is not to be confused with the Serbian diaspora, which refers to migrants, regardless of ethnicity, from Serbia. Due to generalization in censuses outside former Yugoslavia to exclude ethnicity, the total number of the Serb diaspora population cannot be known by certainty. It is estimated that 2–3 million Serbs live outside former Yugoslavia.

Migrational waves
There were several waves of Serb emigration:

 First wave took place since the end of 19th century and lasted until World War II and was caused by economic reasons; particularly large numbers of Serbs (mainly from peripheral ethnic areas such as Herzegovina, Montenegro, Dalmatia, and Lika) emigrated to the United States.
 Second wave took place after the end of the World War II. At this time, members of royalist Chetniks and other political opponents of communist regime fled the country mainly going overseas (United States and Australia) and, to a lesser degree, United Kingdom.
 Third, and by far the largest wave, was economic emigration started in the 1960s when several Western European countries signed bilateral agreements with Yugoslavia allowing the recruitment of industrial workers to those countries, and lasted until the end of the 1980s. Main destinations were West Germany, Austria, and Switzerland, and to a lesser extent France and Sweden. That generation of diaspora is collectively known as gastarbajteri, after German gastarbeiter, "guest-worker", since most of the emigrants headed for German-speaking countries.
 Most recent emigration took place during the 1990s, and was caused by both political and economic reasons. The Yugoslav wars caused many Serbs from Croatia and Bosnia and Herzegovina to leave their countries in the first half of the 1990s. The international economic sanctions imposed on Serbia caused economic collapse with an estimated 300,000 people leaving Serbia during that period, 20% of which had a higher education.

Serb diaspora by states

Notable people
The list include Serbs born abroad, people of full or partial Serbian descent and immigrants from Serbia or Serbian native communities who made significant career abroad.

Actors
 Sasha Alexander
 Milla Jovovich
 Stana Katic
 Karl Malden
 Bojana Novakovic
 Holly Valance
 Natasha Stankovic

Artists and designers
 Roksanda Ilincic

Beauty pageants and models
 Tijana Arnautović
 Myriam Klink
 Veruska Ljubisavljević
 Romina Mattar
 Monika Radulovic

Military people
 Pierre Marinovitch
 Mikhail Miloradovich
 Peter Tekeli
 Marko Ivanovich Voinovich
 Matija Zmajevic

Musicians
 Alex Lifeson
  Alexander Zonjic
 Luigi von Kunits
 Lene Lovich

Politicians
 Claudia Pavlovich Arellano
 Sokollu Mehmed Pasha
 Sava Vladislavich
 George Voinovich

Scientists
 Mileva Marić
 Mihajlo Pupin
 Miodrag Radulovacki
 Nikola Tesla

Sportspeople
 Jelena Dokic
 Milan Lucic
 Pete Maravich
 Kristina Mladenovic
 Milan Vučićević
 Daniel Nestor
 Andrea Petkovic
 Gregg Popovich
 Milos Raonic
 Alex Smith
 Velimir Stjepanović
 Danijel Šarić
 Milan Trajkovic
 James Trifunov
 Bill Vukovich
 Gisela Dulko
 Víctor Manuel Vucetich
 Luka Dončić

Writers
 Charles Simic
 Steve Tesich
 Vladimir Voinovich

Other
 Nick Vujicic

See also
Serbian diaspora
Office for Cooperation with the Diaspora and Serbs in the Region

Notes

References

Sources